Caín  is a 1984 Colombian drama film directed by Gustavo Nieto Roa. The film is based on the eponymous novel written  by  Eduardo Caballero Calderón. The plot sets the biblical story of Cain and Abel in 1960s rural Colombia. It follows the bitter rivalry between two brothers over the love of one woman.

Plot
Don Polo, a rich influential landowner, has only one legitimate son, Abel, who is spoiled, naive and weak. Don Polo’s elder son, Martín, was born out of a relationship with Dionisia, the housekeeper in his farm, which is called El Paraíso (Paradise). Martín and Abel have grown up together but in very different circumstances. Martín has been treated not like a son but like any other peasant in the farm. In spite of these differences, the two brothers have had a good relationship in which the older and more experienced Martín keeps the upper hand. Their friendship breaks up with the arrival of Margarita, a beautiful young woman from a penniless aristocratic family. Margarita’s father was the previous owner of El Paraíso. Both brothers are attracted to the sweet and flirty Margarita and she is torn between the two.

Margarita is more attracted to the handsome and masculine Martín, but Abel is more pliable, and being rich he suits her aspiration of money and position. Pressured by the family priest, Margarita ends up marrying Martín, a decision she soon regrets. Martín, victim of his wife’s social prejudices, leaves the farm. Margarita then asks Abel to live with her. Sometime afterwards, the three get together again and Martín kidnaps Margarita after killing his half-brother. Martin escapes with her towards Colombia’s eastern plains and joins a guerrilla group led by Pedro Palos, his old friend from their military service.

Martin and Margarita are not welcome in the guerrilla band. Margarita is pregnant while Martín, accused of killing Abel, is being sought by the authorities. This makes the guerrilla fighters argue among themselves. In the meantime Margarita gives birth to Abel’s son. Don Polo offers a ransom for Margarita and his newborn grandson. Pedro wants to claim the money offered by Don Polo, and Martín wants to keep his wife and the baby. Both have to escape, each going their own way.

Cast
Armando Gutiérrez as Martín
Marta Liliana Ruíz as Margarita
Jorge Emilio Salazar as Abel
Adolfo Blum as Don Polo
Carmenza Gómez as Dionisia
Sebastián Ospina as Pedro Palos
Luis Eduardo Arango as 
Martha Stella Calle as Angela
Mario Sastre as Father Hoyos
Martha Suarez as guerillera

Production
Caín was the first film produced by Focine (Colombian National Film Bureau). It was inspired by the novel of the same name written by  Eduardo Caballero Calderón in 1968. The film was entirely made in Colombia as part of a project created during the presidency of Belisario Betancur to promote the development of Colombia's film industry. Caín was shot in Boyacá, Cundinamarca and the eastern Colombian plains. Most of the farm scenes where shot in Sogamoso. The Hotel Hacienda Suescún in Tibasosa, Boyaca, served as the farm El Paraíso, central in the film.

Reception
Caín premiered at the 44° International film festival of Cartagena on 5 July 1984. The film  was controversial among critics, but did well at the box office.
Caín received an award at the Hall of Fame in New York; an India Catalina at the International Film festival in Cartagena; an Antena Award given by APE (Association of film critics) and awards from Colcultura. Eduardo Caballero Calderón, author of the novel that inspired the film, was satisfied with the adaptation, but did not wish to see the film to avoid a comparison with the characters and scenarios that were in his imagination.

Notes

References 
García Saucedo, Jaime.Diccionario de literatura Colombiana en el cine . Panamericana Editorial, 2003, 
Fundación Patrimonio Fílmico Colombiano. Nieto, Jorge (edit), Largometrajes Colombianos En Cine y Video: 1915-2004, Fundación Patrimonio Fílmico Colombiano, Ministerio de Cultura, 2006,

External links
 

1984 films
Colombian drama films
Films set in Colombia
1980s Spanish-language films
1984 drama films